Andrew Fulton may refer to:
 Andrew S. Fulton (1800–1884), U.S. Representative, lawyer and judge from Virginia
 Andrew Fulton (mayor) (1850–1925), mayor of Pittsburgh, 1884–1887
 Andrew Fulton (admiral) (1927–2021), Canadian admiral
 Andrew Fulton (diplomat) (born 1944), British diplomat and chairman of the Scottish Conservative Party